The Mark of the Whistler, (aka The Marked Man) is a 1944 American mystery film noir based on the radio drama The Whistler. Directed by William Castle, the production features Richard Dix, Porter Hall and Janis Carter. It is the second of Columbia Pictures' eight "Whistler" films produced in the 1940s, all but the last starring Dix.

Plot summary
A drifter claims the money in a dormant bank account. Later, he becomes the target of men who are the sons of the man's old partner, who is now in prison due to a conflict with him over the money.

Cast
 Richard Dix as Lee Selfridge Nugent
 Janis Carter as Patricia Henley
 Porter Hall as Joe Sorsby
 Paul Guilfoyle  as 'Limpy' Smith
 John Calvert as Eddie Donnelly
 Matt Willis as Perry Donnelly
 Bill Raisch as the truck driver, best known for playing the One Armed Man in The Fugitive. He lost an arm in World War II between the making of this film and The Fugitive.

Reception
Bosley Crowther, the film critic for The New York Times, gave the film a mixed review, writing "The dodges by which a fellow successfully stakes a phony claim to a dormant account in a savings bank and swindles $29,000 lend some fair to middling interest to Columbia's latest Whistler-series film—one called The Mark of the Whistler...In this dubious demonstration, the film does present a criminal case with the patient documentation familiar in crime-and-punishment shorts. But the things that happen to this defrauder after he has got the cash are just the claptrap of cheap melodrama—and they are bluntly presented that way."

References

External links
 
 
 
 
 
 Review of film at Variety

1944 films
1944 mystery films
American mystery films
American black-and-white films
Columbia Pictures films
Film noir
Films based on radio series
Films directed by William Castle
Films based on works by Cornell Woolrich
The Whistler films
1940s English-language films
1940s American films